In the doubles of the 2019 Meerbusch Challenger tennis competition, David Pérez Sanz and Mark Vervoort were the defending champions but only Vervoort chose to defend his title, partnering Íñigo Cervantes. Vervoort lost in the first round to Sander Arends and David Pel.

Andre Begemann and Florin Mergea won the title after defeating Sriram Balaji and Vishnu Vardhan 7–6(7–1), 6–7(4–7), [10–3] in the final.

Seeds

Draw

References

External links
 Main draw

Meerbusch Challenger - Doubles
2019 Doubles